Totally Busted is an adult hidden camera practical joke series that ran original episodes from 2003 to 2006 on Playboy TV.

Format
Totally Busted bears a strong resemblance to past practical joke shows like Candid Camera and Punk'd. Its format revolves around using hidden cameras to put bystanders in awkward sexually-oriented situations.

Utilizing a cast of characters that included Brian Gibson, Erika Jordan, Andrea Lowell, and Steve-O, the show's raunchy approach would often involve public nudity, uncomfortable sex solicitations, and pranks relating to the adult entertainment industry.

Several real pornographic actors appeared throughout the show's run, including Nina Mercedez, Mary Carey, and  Ron Jeremy.

Totally Busted originally ran for a total of four seasons on Playboy TV and was later packaged into DVD sets.

References

External links
Totally Busted Official Site

2003 American television series debuts
2006 American television series endings
Television series by Playboy Enterprises
Playboy TV original programming